Tadeusz Fijas (born 1960) is a Polish former ski jumper.

External links

Living people
Polish male ski jumpers
1960 births
Place of birth missing (living people)
Date of birth missing (living people)
20th-century Polish people